Year 1231 (MCCXXXI) was a common year starting on Wednesday (link will display the full calendar) of the Julian calendar.

Events 
 By place 

 Europe 
 Emperor Frederick II promulgates the Constitutions of Melfi (Liber Augustalis), a collection of laws for Sicily, as well as the Edict of Salerno, regulating the exercise of medicine and separating the professions of physician and apothecary, and requiring medical schools to practice dissection.
 Castillian forces under King Ferdinand III (the Saint) re-conquer the city of Quesada.
 Battle of Jerez: Ferdinand III defeats Emir Ibn Hud of the Taifa of Murcia.

 England 
 Spring – Hubert de Burgh becomes a powerful lord in the Welsh Marches, controlling the castles Cardigan and Carmarthen. He begins to threaten the local Welsh leaders, Llywelyn the Great launches a campaign against Norman lordship in Wales.
 August 13 – King Henry III orders the sheriffs of Hampshire, Dorsetshire and Wiltshire to give Simon de Montfort the possession of the lands of his father, Simon de Montfort (the Elder).
 December – Henry III ends his Welsh campaign and makes peace with Llywelyn the Great.
 The University of Cambridge is granted a royal charter by Henry III.

 Levant 
 Autumn – Frederick II appoints Marshal Richard Filangieri as his imperial legate, and sends an expeditionary army of mostly Lombards for the defense of Jerusalem. He gathers some 600 knights, 100 "sergeants-at-arms", 700 armed infantrymen, and 3,000 marines. The army is supported by 32 war-galleys.
 War of the Lombards: Richard Filangieri sails for Beirut, where the town is handed over to him. He occupies Sidon and Tyre – while other Lombard forces appear before Acre. At Acre, Filangieri summons a meeting of the High Court and shows letters from Frederick II appointing him as ambassador (baili).

 China 
 April 9 – A huge fire breaks out at night in the southeast of Hangzhou during the Song Dynasty. Fighting the flames is difficult due to limited visibility. When the fires are extinguished, it is discovered that an entire district of the city (some 10,000 houses) has been consumed by the flames.

 Mongol Empire 
 August – Ögedei Khan orders the invasion of Korea. A Mongol army crosses the Yalu River and quickly secures the surrender of the border town of Uiju. The Mongols are joined by Hong Bok-won, a Goryeo general, who takes their side with his subordinates numbering some 1500 families.
 Siege of Kuju: Mongol forces besiege the city of Kuju. They deploy assault teams who man siege towers and scale ladders. Despite the fact the Goryeo army is heavily outnumbered, the garrison refuses to surrender. 

 By topic 

 Religion 
 April 13 – Pope Gregory IX issues Parens scientiarum. The bull assures the independence and self-governance of the University of Paris.

Births 
 March 17 – Shijō (Mitsuhito), emperor of Japan (d. 1242)
 Guo Shoujing, Chinese astronomer and engineer (d. 1316)
 James Salomoni, Italian Dominican priest and prior (d. 1314)
 John de Warenne, English nobleman and knight (d. 1304)
 John of Burgundy, French nobleman and knight (d. 1268)
 Philip of Castile, Spanish prince and archbishop (d. 1274)
 Roger Mortimer, English nobleman and knight (d. 1282)
 Tommaso degli Stefani, Italian painter and artist (d. 1310)
 Yolanda of Vianden, Luxembourgian prioress (d. 1283)

Deaths 
 April 6 – William Marshal, English nobleman (b. 1190)
 May 7 – Beatrice II, French countess palatine (b. 1193)
 June 13 – Anthony of Padua, Portuguese priest (b. 1195)
 July 2 – Henry I, German nobleman (House of Zähringen)
 August 3 – Richard le Grant, archbishop of Canterbury
 August 28 – Eleanor of Portugal, queen of Denmark 
 September 3 – William II, French nobleman (b. 1196)
 September 15 – Louis I, German nobleman (b. 1173)
 November 3 – Władysław III, Polish nobleman (b. 1167)
 November 6 – Tsuchimikado, emperor of Japan (b. 1196)
 November 17 – Elizabeth, Hungarian princess (b. 1207)
 November 28 – Valdemar the Young, king of Denmark
 December 7 – Richardis, German noblewoman (b. 1173)
 December 11 – Ida of Nivelles, Flemish nun and mystic 
 December 25 – Folquet de Marselha, French bishop 
 Abd al-Latif al-Baghdadi, Abbasid physician (b. 1162)
 Abu Said al-Baji, Almohad leader and scholar (b. 1156)
 Aurembiaix, Spanish countess (House of Urgell) (b. 1196)
 Dúinnín Ó Maolconaire, Irish historian, poet and writer
 Elisabeth of Brandenburg, German noblewoman (b. 1206)
 Gonzalo Rodríguez Girón, Spanish nobleman (b. 1160)
 Ibn al-Qattan, Almohad imam, scholar and intellectual
 Ibn Muti al-Zawawi, Almohad jurist, philologian and writer
 Jalal al-Din Mangburni, ruler of the Khwarazmian Empire
 Matthew FitzHerbert, English nobleman and high sheriff
 Meinhard II (the Elder), German nobleman and knight
 William of Auxerre, French archdeacon and theologian
 Zhao Rukuo, Chinese historian and politician (b. 1170)

References